Pansexualism is a hypothesis in psychology "that regards all desire and interest as derived from [the] sex instinct" or, in other words, "that the sex instinct plays the primary part in all human activity, mental and physical".

Pansexualism, as a hypothesis, is the norm in the early psychological school of Freudian or classical psychoanalysis. According to Sigmund Freud, a defining characteristic of humans is an overdeveloped sexual instinct, an excess that is said to explain the existence of human culture. The notion of pansexualism identifies the concept of eroticism as the leading human motivation. The thinker Johann Christoph Friedrich von Schiller used the term to explain the aesthetic and sensual civilization that reconciled sensuality with reason.

References

Psychoanalytic theory
Pansexuality